State Route 261 (SR 261) is a  state highway in the U.S. state of Washington. Serving Columbia, Franklin, and Adams counties, the highway begins at U.S. Route 12 (US 12) east of Starbuck and becomes concurrent with SR 260 from Kahlotus to SR 26 in Washtucna before ending at Interstate 90 (I-90) and US 395 in Ritzville. The highway has been legislated since 1937 from Ritzville to Washtucna as Secondary State Highway 11E (SSH 11E) and in 1957 from Washtucna to the Starbuck area as a branch of SSH 11B. The two secondary highways became SR 261 during the 1964 highway renumbering, and a gap between Washtucna and Starbuck was not paved until the construction of the Snake River Bridge was completed in 1968.

Route description
SR 261 begins its  route at an intersection with US 12 east of the town of Starbuck in rural Columbia County. The roadway travels north over the Pataha Creek and turns west, paralleling the Tucannon River through Starbuck and to the south bank of the Snake River. The highway passes over a rail bridge owned by the Washington State Department of Transportation before turning northwest and crossing the steel cantilever Snake River Bridge, listed on the National Register of Historic Places, into Franklin County near Lyons Ferry Park. At the north end of the bridge, SR 261 continues northwest, passing under a Union Pacific Railroad bridge and near Palouse Falls State Park, before crossing the Columbia Plateau Trail and intersecting SR 260 northeast of Kahlotus. A concurrency with SR 260 travels northeast into Adams County parallel to the Columbia Plateau Trail in the Palouse before entering Washtucna and being designated as Main Street. Main Street intersects SR 26, forming the eastern terminus of SR 260, after the Columbia Plateau Trail turns east. SR 261 continues north into farmland and crosses the John Wayne Pioneer Trail in Ralston before its northern terminus at a diamond interchange with I-90 and US 395 southeast of Ritzville, becoming Division Street as it serves the city.

Every year, the Washington State Department of Transportation (WSDOT) conducts a series of surveys on its highways in the state to measure traffic volume. This is expressed in terms of average annual daily traffic (AADT), which is a measure of traffic volume for any average day of the year. In 2011, WSDOT calculated that between 300 and 3,000 vehicles per day used the highway, mostly between Washtucna and Ritzville.

History

The Mullan Road was constructed in 1862 and crossed the Snake River with a ferry crossing at Lyons Ferry until the construction of the Lower Monumental Dam downstream caused the water level to rise and longer wait times, resulting in the reconstruction of the Snake River Bridge. The current route of SR 261 from Washtucna to Ritzville was designated during the creation of the Primary and secondary state highways in 1937 as SSH 11E. A branch of SSH 11B was added in 1957 that extended from Washtunca to US 410, later an extension of US 12, east of Starbuck with an un-built bridge over the Snake River at Lyons Ferry. Both highways became SR 261 during the 1964 highway renumbering, but the section between Starbuck and Washtucna was not paved. The completion of the Snake River Bridge in 1968, using the dismantled steel cantilevered Vantage Bridge and listed onto the National Register of Historic Places in 1982, finished the highway.

Major intersections

References

External links

Highways of Washington State

261
Transportation in Columbia County, Washington
Transportation in Franklin County, Washington
Transportation in Adams County, Washington